As Told by Ginger is an American animated series that ran from October 25, 2000, to November 14, 2006. The series ended production in 2003, and by 2005 the series had fully aired on international versions of Nickelodeon in other countries, while in the United States the series was taken off Nickelodeon's schedule in 2004 during the third season. Two previously unaired episodes from the third season premiered on Nickelodeon's sister channel, Nicktoons, in November 2004 and November 2006. 

Six episodes from the third season remained unaired in the United States as of late 2006. After a decade, four of the unaired episodes made their television debut in the United States on TeenNick's NickRewind block, "The Splat", in late October 2016. Two episodes from the third season remained unaired in the United States after late 2016 (although the series finale, The Wedding Frame, was previously released direct-to-DVD in region 1 in November 2004) – both of these episodes were released on CBS All Access in January 2021.

Series overview

Episodes

Pilot (1998)

Season 1 (2000–2001)

Season 2 (2002–2003)

Season 3 (2003–2004; 2006)
 The first 10 episodes of this season aired on Nickelodeon from 2003 to 2004. After Nickelodeon ceased airing new episodes of the series, 2 previously episodes aired on Nicktoons in 2004 and 2006. The show officially ended on November 14, 2006. In October 2016, TeenNick's nighttime block The Splat aired 4 previously unaired episodes. In January 2021, CBS All Access released all three seasons of the series, including "Battle of The Bands" and "The Wedding Frame", which have never aired in the United States before.

Notes

References

As Told by Ginger
Lists of American children's animated television series episodes
Lists of American teen drama television series episodes
Lists of Nickelodeon television series episodes